The Washington Run Railroad was a branch line in Pennsylvania. Starting at a junction with the B&O Railroad in Layton, the line crossed the Youghiogheny River on a bridge (Layton Bridge) and passed through a tunnel (both built by the A.P. Roberts Construction Company) to continue to Perryopolis. From there, it continued to Star Junction on a track that ran parallel to today's Pennsylvania Route 51.

The railroad had a passenger car that it used for passenger service, but it was primarily a freight carrier, transporting coke produced at Star Junction and coal for the Washington Coal and Coke Company and the Cochran Coal Company. It also served the brickworks in Layton and had a stop in Victoria.

The railroad ceased operation in 1931. Layton Bridge and the adjacent tunnel still serve as a single lane part of Layton Road (State Route 4038).

References

External links
 Website with postcard view of the railroad tunnel 

Defunct Pennsylvania railroads
Transportation in Fayette County, Pennsylvania
Railway companies established in 1899
Railroad tunnels in Pennsylvania
1899 establishments in Pennsylvania
1931 disestablishments in Pennsylvania